The 1954 World Sportscar Championship season was the second season of FIA World Sportscar Championship motor racing. It featured a series of six endurance races for sportscars, contested from 24 January to 23 November 1954. The championship was won by Ferrari.

Season summary

The 1954 World Sports Car Championship was contested over a six race series. With legendary races such as the Mille Miglia and the Carrera Panamericana now part of the international race calendar, they were accompanied by the 24 Hours of Le Mans, 12 Hours of Sebring and the RAC Tourist Trophy. The championship started in January in Argentina with a new race to the calendar, the 1000 km Buenos Aires, but the 24 Hours of Spa was omitted. The 1000 km Nürburgring was originally scheduled for the 29th of August, however once it became clear that the Mercedes 300 SLRs would not be ready in time, the race was cancelled with organisers fearing another poor attendance.

The Championship remained as a competition for manufacturers, and works teams including Scuderia Ferrari, Lancia, Aston Martin and Jaguar lead the way. The majority of the fields were made up of amateur or gentlemen drivers in privately entered cars, often up against professional racing drivers with experience in Formula One.

All races included Sportscar classes defined according to engine displacement. The Millie Miglia also defined classes for Grand Touring and Special Touring cars and the Carrera Panamericana included additional Stock car and Touring car classes. Championship points were however only awarded for outright placings. Ferrari continued to be the dominant force in 1954, winning four of the six races, a result of Enzo Ferrari’s determination to bring prestige to his marque. The other two races were also won by Italian marques, Lancia and O.S.C.A.

Season results

Results

Note: The Tourist Trophy was awarded to the DB of Paul Armagnac and Gerard Laureau, which was the winner of the Dundrod race on handicap. World Championship points were awarded on the overall race results rather than the handicap results.

Championship
Championship points were awarded for the first six places in each race in the order of 8-6-4-3-2-1.  Manufacturers were only awarded points for their highest finishing car  with no points awarded for positions filled by additional cars. Only the best 4 results out of the 6 races could be retained by each manufacturer. Points earned but not counted towards the championship totals are listed within brackets in the table below.

The cars
The following models contributed to the nett championship pointscores of their respective manufacturers.

 Ferrari 375 MM, Ferrari 375 Plus and Ferrari 750 Monza
 Lancia D24 
 Jaguar C-type and Jaguar D-type
 Osca MT4 1500
 Maserati A6GCS
 Porsche 550 Spyder
 Cunningham-Chrysler C-4R
 Austin-Healey 100
 Aston Martin DB3S
 HWM Jaguar 108
 Kieft-Bristol Sport 
 Gordini T15S

References

 
World Sportscar Championship seasons
Sports